Naveen Chandra is an Indian actor who predominantly acts in Telugu films. He starred in the Telugu romance film Andala Rakshasi (2012) and won critical acclaim for his performance, before playing leading roles in Tamil films.

Early life 
Naveen Chandra was born in a Telugu family in Devi Nagar of Bellary. His father was a head mechanic in KSRTC. Chandra obtained a diploma in Mechanical Engineering and worked as a multimedia animator before he forayed into films.

Career
Chandra made his debut as a hero in Telugu with the movie Sambhavami Yuge Yuge under the stage name Anji in the year 2006, and later acted in the movie Kalyanam under the stage name Chandu. Chandra made his debut as a hero in Tamil with Pazhaniappa Kalloori  under the stage name Pradeep. His next film Agarathi never saw a theatrical release. In 2012, he starred in the Telugu movie Andala Rakshasi which garnered him positive responses from viewers and critics for his performance in his role as Surya. He shot for the Tamil film Therodum Veedhiyile with Payal Ghosh in 2012.

In the bilingual film Dalam, Chandra played an ex-naxalite who struggles to return to a normal life. For his role in Sathyashiva's Sivappu, he lived incognito as a labourer in his friend's construction company for two weeks in order to get into his character. The film also released in 2014. He was also signed as the second lead in the Tamil film Brahman. He has signed on for the lead role in producer C. V. Kumar's Sarabam. He next appeared in Miss India starring Keerthy Suresh under the direction of Narendra Nath.

Filmography

Film

Television

References

External links
 

Indian male film actors
21st-century Indian male actors
Living people
Male actors in Tamil cinema
Year of birth missing (living people)
Male actors in Telugu cinema
Telugu male actors
Male actors from Karnataka